The men's marathon competition at the 2002 Asian Games in Busan, South Korea was held on 14 October at the Busan Asiad Main Stadium.

Schedule
All times are Korea Standard Time (UTC+09:00)

Records

Results 
Legend
DNF — Did not finish

References

External links 
Results

Athletics at the 2002 Asian Games
2002
2002 Asian Games
Asian
2002 Asian Games